Nunukan Regency is a regency of North Kalimantan Province in Indonesia. Nunukan Regency shares international borders with the Malaysian states of Sabah to the north and Sarawak to the west, and inter-regency borders with Tana Tidung Regency and Malinau Regency to the south. The regency covers an area of 14,247.50 km2 and it had a population of 140,841 at the 2010 census and 199,090 at the 2020 census. The official estimate as at mid 2021 was 203,220.

Nunukan is also the name of an island within this regency. It has an area of 226 km2. Nunukan town, the capital of the regency, is located on Nunukan Island, which comprises the insular section of Nunukan District (which also includes part of the 'mainland' of Kalimantan) and the whole of the separate Nunukan Selatan District. It is a major port for ferry crossings to Tawau in Sabah state, Malaysia.

North of Nunukan Island is Sebatik Island, which lies partly within Indonesia and partly within Malaysia. The Indonesian portion has an area of 246.61 km2 and had a population of 47,571 at the 2020 census, comprising five of the regency's districts.

Demographic

Ethnicity 
 Bugis
 Tidung
 Bajau people
 Murut people
 Lun Bawang
 Tausug
 Penan
 Kelabit
 Kedayan
 Orang Ulu
 Kenyah
 Kayan

Religion

Administrative Districts
At the 2010 census, the regency was divided into nine districts (kecamatan), but subsequently another twelve new districts have been created by the division of existing regencies. All these are tabulated below with their areas and their populations at the 2010 census and the 2020 census, together with the official estimates as at mid 2921. The table also includes the locations of the district administrative centres, the number of administrative villages (rural desa and urban kelurahan) in each district, and its postal codes.

Notes: (a) the population figures given for Krayan District and Krayan Selatan District include the populations of the three most recently created districts. The Apokayan region (i.e. all the first five districts listed above) comprises the entire western section of the Regency, separated from Malaysia by the meandering Kayan River. (b) the 2010 populations of Lumbis Ogong District, Lumbis Pansiangan District and Lumbis Hulu District are included in the figure for Lumbis District, from which they were split. The number of villages and the post codes of Lumbis Pansiangan District and Lumbis Hulu District are included in the figures for Lumbis Ogong District. (c) the 2010 population of Sembakung Atulai District is included in the figure for Sembakung District, from which it was split. (d) the 2010 populations of Tulin Onsoi District and Sei Menggaris District are included in the figure for Sebuku District, from which they were split. (e) Nunukan District comprises the western half of Nunukan Island (including the town of Nunukan), together with adjacent areas on the 'mainland' of Kalimantan. (f) Nunukan Selatan District comprises the eastern half of Nunukan Island. (g) Sebatik District comprises a southeast portion of Sebatik Island, while Sebatik Barat District comprises a southwest portion (the northern half of this island is part of Malaysian North Borneo, as the international boundary divides this island in two). (h) Since 2010, three additional districts have been created on (the Indonesian portion of) Sebatik Island - Sebatik Timur, Sebatik Tengah and Sebatik Utara - by the division of existing districts. The popululations in these districts in 2010 are included with the figures for Sebatik Barat District and Sebatik District.

Climate
Nunukan town, the seat of the regency has a tropical rainforest climate (Af) with moderate rainfall in January and February and heavy rainfall in the remaining months.

References

Regencies of North Kalimantan